The 1964–65 Polska Liga Hokejowa season was the 30th season of the Polska Liga Hokejowa, the top level of ice hockey in Poland. Eight teams participated in the league, and GKS Katowice won the championship.

Final round

5th-8th place

External links
Season on hockeyarchives.info

Polska
Polska Hokej Liga seasons
1964–65 in Polish ice hockey